Nathewal is a small village near the town of phagwara in the Jalandhar district in the Indian state of Punjab. The nearest villages include Rurkee, Ucha pind, Rurka Kalan, Sunner Khurd, Kahna Dhesian, Sarhali, Dhani Pind and Bundala.

History
Kaushal / Koshal family

The name of the village originates from Nathuram, an original member of the Kaushal family.  

The village is predominantly overseen by the Kaushal lineage, who are still sought after for advice, including matters of personal, family and business matters. They have acted as Lambardar (village head) for many generations. Members of the Kaushal clan have also emigrated to various parts of the world, including the U.K., U.S., Canada and Australia.

Lai Kaushal Jathere

Lai Kaushal Jathere is a shrine in the village, which had been constructed in the past, to commemorate and show respect to the ancestors of the village.

Present
The sarpanch of the village is Jeet Ram and the panch are Lucky Kaushal, Satnam Rai, Boota Ram. The present Lambardar is Rajan Kaushal. Pallram Rai is Chokidar.

School
The GPS School in Nathewal is a Government Primary school. This school holds the record of the most hygienic school in the Jalandhar district. This school is headed by Master Ajmer Singh.

Crops
Crops grown in this region include wheat, rice, sugar cane, vegetables, maize and barley.

References 

https://wikimapia.org/13711334/Nathewal

Villages in Jalandhar district